Beyond Good and Evil is a book by Friedrich Nietzsche.

Beyond Good and Evil may also refer to:

 Beyond Good and Evil (album), a 2001 album by The Cult
 Beyond Good and Evil (film), a 1977 Italian-French film by Liliana Cavani
 Beyond Good & Evil (video game), a 2003 action-adventure video game
Beyond Good and Evil 2, an upcoming prequel
 "Beyond Good and Evil" (X-Men episode), a four-part episode of the animated TV series X-Men
 Jenseits von Gut und Böse (album), or Beyond Good and Evil, a 2011 album by Bushido
 "Beyond Good and Evil", a 1993 song by At the Gates from With Fear I Kiss the Burning Darkness
 "Beyond Good and Evil", a 2008 song by Grand Magus from Iron Will
 "Beyond Good and Evil", a 2014 song by Machinae Supremacy from Phantom Shadow

See also
 "She is Beyond Good and Evil", a 1979 song by The Pop Group
 Xenosaga Episode II: Jenseits von Gut und Böse, a 2004 video game